General elections were held in Saint Vincent and the Grenadines in 1954. The majority of seats were won by independents. Voter turnout was 59.8%.

Results

References

Saint Vincent
Elections in Saint Vincent and the Grenadines
1954 in Saint Vincent and the Grenadines
British Windward Islands